Tatlı İntikam is a Turkish television series broadcast on Kanal D. It is produced by D Productions, directed by Barış Erçetin and written by Pınar Ordu and İlker Arslan.
It's the story of two people who were together in college. Sinan (Furkan Andıç) has fallen in love with Pelin (Leyla Lydia Tugutlu) but Pelin rejected his feelings and insulted him in front of all. They two meet each other again after many years. Pelin asks Sinan for help to change her fate and the situation brings them together. Pelin and Sinan both are in love, but faces many consequences.

Summary
Convinced that her misfortunes in her love life are the karma brought to her by the way she behaved towards her college friend in the past, Pelin Soylu (Leyla Lydia Tuğutlu) tries to get forgiveness from Tankut Sinan Yılmaz (Furkan Andıç). Sinan, whose life changed due to Pelin, decides to get his own sweet revenge on her.

Plot
Pelin Soylu (Leyla Lydia Tuğutlu), who had nothing but bad luck when it comes to her love life, finally has broken the curse. She is about to marry Tolga who is the man of her dreams but something unexpected happens as Tolga runs away from the wedding, leaving Pelin heartbroken. Pelin is comforted by her friends, as she is confronted by a woman who tells her that she is cursed by someone from her past and this is why she is so unlucky in love.

Pelin starts to questions her pasts along with her friends. Pelin suddenly remembers of Tankut Sinan Yılmaz (Furkan Andiç), who was in love with her while they both were attending the university. It is revealed that Sinan loved Pelin, but she rejected his feelings and insulted him in front of all. This left Sinan heart-broken and he quits his studies and left the university.

In the present day, Pelin tries to search for Sinan everywhere but she is unable to find him. Later, she goes to a restaurant's opening ceremony and there she finds a completely changed Sinan who is no longer the same person whom Pelin had known in the university. He is revealed to be the owner of the restaurant. Pelin tries to ask forgiveness from Sinan but he finds out that she is doing only this for her lovelife and is not ready to forgive her. Pelin realizes that Sinan will not forgive her that easily and she is ready to do whatever he asked of her. Sinan has every intention of making Pelin beg, so he starts his game of revenge. But things do not go very well for the two of them.

Cast

International broadcasts 

  | On Urdu 1 as Ek Haseen Inteqaam
  | On Tring TV as Hakmarrje e Ëmbël
  | On Fox Life as Sweet Revenge

References

External links

2016 Turkish television series debuts
Turkish romantic comedy television series
Television series by D Productions
Kanal D original programming
Turkish-language television shows
Turkish drama television series
Television series produced in Istanbul
Television shows set in Istanbul
Television series set in the 2010s